In linear algebra, the Cayley–Hamilton theorem (named after the mathematicians Arthur Cayley and William Rowan Hamilton) states that every square matrix over a commutative ring (such as the real or complex numbers or the integers) satisfies its own characteristic equation.

When the ring is a field, the Cayley–Hamilton theorem is equivalent to the statement that the minimal polynomial of a square matrix divides its characteristic polynomial. 
The theorem was first proven in 1853 in terms of inverses of linear functions of quaternions, a non-commutative ring, by Hamilton. This corresponds to the special case of certain  real or  complex matrices. The theorem holds for general quaternionic matrices. The general case was first proved by Ferdinand Frobenius in 1878.

Examples

matrices 

matrices 

As a concrete example, let

Its characteristic polynomial is given by

The Cayley–Hamilton theorem claims that, if we define

then

We can verify by computation that indeed,

For a generic  matrix,

which is indeed always the case, evident by working out the entries of 2.

Applications

Determinant and inverse matrix

For a general  invertible matrix , i.e., one with nonzero determinant, −1 can thus be written as an  order  polynomial expression in :   As indicated,  the Cayley–Hamilton theorem amounts to  the identity 

Using Newton identities, the elementary symmetric polynomials can in turn be expressed in terms of power sum symmetric polynomials of the eigenvalues: 
 
where  is the trace of the matrix .

In general, the formula for the coefficients  is given in terms of complete exponential Bell polynomials as 

In particular, the determinant of  equals . Thus, the determinant can be written as the trace identity:

Likewise, the characteristic polynomial can be written as

Another method for obtaining these coefficients  for a general  matrix, provided no root be zero, relies on the following alternative expression for the determinant,

Hence, by virtue of the Mercator series,

where the exponential only needs be expanded to order , since  is of order , the net negative powers of  automatically vanishing by the C–H theorem. (Again, this requires a ring containing the rational numbers.) Differentiation of this expression with respect to  allows one to express the coefficients of the characteristic polynomial for general  as determinants of  matrices,

 Examples

Using these to specify the coefficients  of the characteristic polynomial of a  matrix yields

The coefficient  gives the determinant of the  matrix,  minus its trace, while its inverse is given by

It is apparent from the general formula for cn−k, expressed in terms of Bell polynomials, that the expressions

So, for a  matrix , the statement of the Cayley–Hamilton theorem can also be written as

where the right-hand side designates a  matrix with all entries reduced to zero. Likewise, this determinant in the  case, is now

Similarly, one can write for a  matrix ,

and so on for larger matrices. The increasingly complex expressions for the coefficients  is deducible from Newton's identities or the Faddeev–LeVerrier algorithm.

n-th power of matrix

As an example, for  the theorem gives 

Then, to calculate , observe

Likewise,

Notice that we have been able to write the matrix power as the sum of two terms. In fact, matrix power of any order  can be written as a matrix polynomial of degree at most , where  is the size of a square matrix. This is an instance where Cayley–Hamilton theorem can be used to express a matrix function, which we will discuss below systematically.

Matrix functions
Given an analytic function

and the characteristic polynomial  of degree  of an  matrix , the function can be expressed using long division as 

By the Cayley–Hamilton theorem, replacing  by the matrix  gives , so one has

Let the remainder polynomial be

Since , evaluating the function  at the  eigenvalues of  yields

This amounts to a system of  linear equations, which can be solved to determine the coefficients . Thus, one has 

For such cases, for an eigenvalue  with multiplicity , the first  derivatives of  vanish at the eigenvalue. This 
leads to the extra  linearly independent solutions 

Finding a polynomial that passes through the points  is essentially an interpolation problem, and can be solved using Lagrange or Newton interpolation techniques, leading to Sylvester's formula.

For example, suppose the task is to find the polynomial representation of 

Let .

Thus, it follows that

As a further example, when considering

Thus, for this case,

which is a rotation matrix.

Standard examples of such usage is the exponential map from the Lie algebra of a matrix Lie group into the group. It is given by a matrix exponential,

which is Rodrigues' rotation formula. For the notation, see 3D rotation group#A note on Lie algebras.

The group  is the conformal group of spacetime,  its simply connected cover (to be precise, the simply connected cover of the connected component  of ). The expressions obtained apply to the standard representation of these groups. They require knowledge of (some of) the eigenvalues of the matrix to exponentiate. For  (and hence for ), closed expressions have   been obtained for all irreducible representations, i.e. of any spin.

Algebraic number theory
The Cayley–Hamilton theorem is an effective tool for computing the minimal polynomial of algebraic integers.

Proofs 
The Cayley–Hamilton theorem is an immediate consequence of the existence of the Jordan normal form for matrices over algebraically closed fields, see . In this section, direct proofs are presented.

As the examples above show, obtaining the statement of the Cayley–Hamilton theorem for an  matrix

 

and then these coefficients are used in a linear combination of powers of  that is equated to the  zero matrix:

None of these computations, however, can show why the Cayley–Hamilton theorem should be valid for matrices of all possible sizes , so a uniform proof for all  is needed.

Preliminaries 

This holds for all possible eigenvalues , so the two matrices equated by the theorem certainly give the same (null) result when applied to any eigenvector.

Consider now the function  which maps  matrices to  matrices given by the formula , i.e. which takes a matrix  and plugs it into its own characteristic polynomial. Not all matrices are diagonalizable, but for matrices with complex coefficients many of them are: the set  of diagonalizable complex square matrices of a given size is dense in the set of all such square matrices (for a matrix to be diagonalizable it suffices for instance that its characteristic polynomial not have any multiple roots).  Now viewed as a function  (since matrices have entries) we see that this function is continuous. This is true because the entries of the image of a matrix are given by polynomials in the entries of the matrix. Since

and since the set  is dense, by continuity this function must map the entire set of  matrices to the zero matrix. Therefore, the Cayley–Hamilton theorem is true for complex numbers, and must therefore also hold for - or -valued matrices.

While this provides a valid proof, the argument is not very satisfactory, since the identities represented by the theorem do not in any way depend on the nature of the matrix (diagonalizable or not), nor on the kind of entries allowed (for matrices with real entries the diagonalizable ones do not form a dense set, and it seems strange one would have to consider complex matrices to see that the Cayley–Hamilton theorem holds for them). We shall therefore now consider only arguments that prove the theorem directly for any matrix using algebraic manipulations only; these also have the benefit of working for matrices with entries in any commutative ring.

There is a great variety of such proofs of the Cayley–Hamilton theorem, of which several will be given here. They vary in the amount of abstract algebraic notions required to understand the proof. The simplest proofs use just those notions needed to formulate the theorem (matrices, polynomials with numeric entries, determinants), but involve technical computations that render somewhat mysterious the fact that they lead precisely to the correct conclusion. It is possible to avoid such details, but at the price of involving more subtle algebraic notions: polynomials with coefficients in a non-commutative ring, or matrices with unusual kinds of entries.

Adjugate matrices 
All proofs below use the notion of the adjugate matrix  of an  matrix , the transpose of its cofactor matrix.

Being a consequence of just algebraic expression manipulation, these relations are valid for matrices with entries in any commutative ring (commutativity must be assumed for determinants to be defined in the first place). This is important to note here, because these relations will be applied below for matrices with non-numeric entries such as polynomials.

A direct algebraic proof 
This proof uses just the kind of objects needed to formulate the Cayley–Hamilton theorem: matrices with polynomials as entries.

Then, according to the right-hand fundamental relation of the adjugate, one has

While this looks like a polynomial with matrices as coefficients, we shall not consider such a notion; it is just a way to write a matrix with polynomial entries as a linear combination of  constant matrices, and the coefficient  has been written to the left of the matrix to stress this point of view.

Now, one can expand the matrix product in our equation by bilinearity:

Writing

Such an equality can hold only if in any matrix position the entry that is multiplied by a given power  is the same on both sides; it follows that the constant matrices with coefficient  in both expressions must be equal.

The left-hand sides form a telescoping sum and cancel completely; the right-hand sides add up to :

This completes the proof.

A proof using polynomials with matrix coefficients 
This proof is similar to the first one, but tries to give meaning to the notion of polynomial with matrix coefficients that was suggested by the expressions occurring in that proof. This requires considerable care, since it is somewhat unusual to consider polynomials with coefficients in a non-commutative ring, and not all reasoning that is valid for commutative polynomials can be applied in this setting.

Notably, while arithmetic of polynomials over a commutative ring models the arithmetic of polynomial functions, this is not the case over a non-commutative ring (in fact there is no obvious notion of polynomial function in this case that is closed under multiplication).

Let  be the ring of  matrices with entries in some ring R (such as the real or complex numbers) that has  as an element.

respecting the order of the coefficient matrices from the two operands; obviously this gives a non-commutative multiplication.

Thus, the identity

But this map is not a ring homomorphism: the right-evaluation of a product differs in general from the product of the right-evaluations.

One can work around this difficulty in the particular situation at hand, since the above right-evaluation map does become a ring homomorphism if the matrix  is in the center of the ring of coefficients, so that it commutes with all the coefficients of the polynomials (the argument proving this is straightforward, exactly because commuting  with coefficients is now justified after evaluation).

To do this, one combines the two fundamental relations for adjugates, writing out the adjugate B as a polynomial:

Equating the coefficients shows that for each i, we have  as desired. Having found the proper setting in which ev is indeed a homomorphism of rings, one can complete the proof as suggested above:

This completes the proof.

A synthesis of the first two  proofs 
In the first proof, one was able to determine the coefficients  of  based on the right-hand fundamental relation for the adjugate only. In fact the first  equations derived can be interpreted as determining the quotient  of the Euclidean division of the polynomial  on the left by the monic polynomial , while the final equation expresses the fact that the remainder is zero. This division is performed in the ring of polynomials with matrix coefficients. Indeed, even over a non-commutative ring, Euclidean division by a monic polynomial  is defined, and always produces a unique quotient and remainder with the same degree condition as in the commutative case, provided it is specified at which side one wishes  to be a factor (here that is to the left).

in other words, to apply the evaluation map

which is a ring homomorphism, giving

just like in the second proof, as desired.

valid for all  matrices, where 
 

A proof using matrices of endomorphisms 
As was mentioned above, the matrix p(A) in statement of the theorem is obtained by first evaluating the determinant and then substituting the matrix A for t; doing that substitution into the matrix  before evaluating the determinant is not meaningful. Nevertheless, it is possible to give an interpretation where p(A) is obtained directly as the value of a certain determinant, but this requires a more complicated setting, one of matrices over a ring in which one can interpret both the entries  of A, and all of A itself. But considering matrices with matrices as entries might cause confusion with block matrices, which is not intended, as that gives the wrong notion of determinant (recall that the determinant of a matrix is defined as a sum of products of its entries, and in the case of a block matrix this is generally not the same as the corresponding sum of products of its blocks!). It is clearer to distinguish A from the endomorphism φ of an  vector space V (or free R-module if R is not a field) defined by it in a basis , and to take matrices over the ring End(V) of all such endomorphisms. However, since End(V) is not a commutative ring, no determinant is defined on M(n, End(V)); this can only be done for matrices over a commutative subring of End(V). Now the entries of the matrix  all lie in the subring R[φ] generated by the identity and φ, which is commutative. Then a determinant map M(n, R[φ]) → R[φ] is defined, and  evaluates to the value p(φ) of the characteristic polynomial of A at φ (this holds independently of the relation between A and φ); the Cayley–Hamilton theorem states that p(φ) is the null endomorphism.

The fact that A is the matrix of φ in the basis e1, ..., en means that

One can interpret these as n components of one equation in V&hairsp;n, whose members can be written using the matrix-vector product M(n, End(V)) × V&hairsp;n → V&hairsp;n that is defined as usual, but with individual entries ψ ∈ End(V) and v in V being "multiplied" by forming ; this gives:

where  is the element whose component i is ei (in other words it is the basis e1, ..., en of V written as a column of vectors). Writing this equation as

one recognizes the transpose of the matrix  considered above, and its determinant (as element of M(n, R[φ])) is also p(φ).

the associativity of matrix-matrix and matrix-vector multiplication used in the first step is a purely formal property of those operations, independent of the nature of the entries. Now component i of this equation says that p(φ)(ei) = 0 ∈ V; thus p(φ) vanishes on all ei, and since these elements generate V it follows that p(φ) = 0 ∈ End(V), completing the proof.

One additional fact that follows from this proof is that the matrix A whose characteristic polynomial is taken need not be identical to the value φ substituted into that polynomial; it suffices that φ be an endomorphism of V satisfying the initial equations

for some sequence of elements e1, ..., en that generate V (which space might have smaller dimension than n, or in case the ring R is not a field it might not be a free module at all).

A bogus "proof": p(A) = det(AIn − A) = det(A − A) = 0 
One persistent elementary but incorrect argument  for the theorem is to "simply" take the definition

There are many ways to see why this argument is wrong. First, in the Cayley–Hamilton theorem, p(A) is an n × n matrix.  However, the right hand side of the above equation is the value of a determinant, which is a scalar. So they cannot be equated unless n = 1 (i.e. A is just a scalar).  Second, in the expression , the variable λ actually occurs at the diagonal entries of the matrix .  To illustrate, consider the characteristic polynomial in the previous example again:

If one substitutes the entire matrix A for λ in those positions, one obtains

in which the "matrix" expression is simply not a valid one.  Note, however, that if scalar multiples of identity matrices
instead of scalars are subtracted in the above, i.e. if the substitution is performed as

So the argument that  still does not apply.

Actually, if such an argument holds, it should also hold when other multilinear forms instead of determinant is used. For instance, if we consider the permanent function and define , then by the same argument, we should be able to "prove" that q(A) = 0.  But this statement is demonstrably wrong: in the 2-dimensional case, for instance, the permanent of a matrix is given by

So, for the matrix A in the previous example,

Yet one can verify that

One of the proofs for Cayley–Hamilton theorem above bears some similarity to the argument that . By introducing a matrix with non-numeric coefficients, one can actually let A live inside a matrix entry, but then  is not equal to A, and the conclusion is reached differently.

Proofs using methods of abstract algebra

See also .

Abstraction and generalizations

The above proofs show that the Cayley–Hamilton theorem holds for matrices with entries in any commutative ring R, and that p(φ) = 0 will hold whenever φ is an endomorphism of an R-module generated by elements e1,...,en that satisfies

This more general version of the theorem is the source of the celebrated Nakayama lemma in commutative algebra and algebraic geometry.

See also
 Companion matrix

Remarks

Notes

References 
 (open access)

 
 

 (communicated on June 9, 1862)
 (communicated on June 23, 1862)
  "Classroom Note: A Simple Proof of the Leverrier--Faddeev Characteristic Polynomial Algorithm" 

 (open archive).

External links

A proof from PlanetMath.
The Cayley–Hamilton theorem at MathPages

Theorems in linear algebra
Articles containing proofs
Matrix theory
William Rowan Hamilton